The 1957 NBA World Championship Series was the championship series of the 1956–57 National Basketball Association season, and was the conclusion of the 1957 NBA Playoffs. The best-of-seven series was played between the Western Division champion St. Louis Hawks and the Eastern Division champion Boston Celtics. This was the first trip to the Finals for each team, the first Finals in which both teams competing were making their first appearances since 1951. Red Auerbach became the first head coach to have taken two separate teams to the NBA Finals, having done so with Washington in 1949. The Celtics won the series over the Hawks, 4–3. It remains the only Game 7 in NBA history to be decided in double-overtime.

Game summaries

Celtics win series 4–3

Team rosters

Boston Celtics

St. Louis Hawks

Records
Celtics center Bill Russell set a rookie record for rebounds in a single NBA finals game with 32 in game 7, and averaged an NBA finals rookie record of 22.9 rebounds per game for the entire series.

References

External links
NBA History

Finals
National Basketball Association Finals
NBA
NBA
Basketball competitions in Boston
Basketball competitions in St. Louis
March 1957 sports events in the United States
April 1957 sports events in the United States
1950s in Boston
1950s in St. Louis
1957 in sports in Missouri
1957 in sports in Massachusetts